Wólka Kozłowska  is a village in the administrative district of Gmina Tłuszcz, within Wołomin County, Masovian Voivodeship, in east-central Poland.

References

Villages in Wołomin County
Warsaw Governorate
Warsaw Voivodeship (1919–1939)